Lal Darwaza Mosque (Red Portal mosque or Ruby Gate mosque) of Jaunpur, was built in 1447 by Queen Rajye Bibi and dedicated to Sayyid Ali Dawood Kutubbudin a saint.

History
The Lal Darwaza Masjid was built with the palace of Bibi Raji, who was the Queen of Sultan Mahmood Sharqi, a ruler of the Sharqi Dynasty. The Lal Darwaza Masjid, Jaunpur was formed to serve as a private mosque for the Queen.

Bibi Raji established a religious school in the area surrounding the Lal Darwaza in Jaunpur for all the local Muslim residents. The school (or Madrasa) was named Jamia Hussainia and it exists till date.

Description
This Mosque was built in 1447 (as per inscription of this mosque), during the reign of Sultan Mahmud Sharqi, by Queen Bibi Rajyi, dedicated to Maulana Sayyid Ali Dawood Kutubbudin, a celebrated saint (Maulana) of Jaunpur, whose descendants still live in the mohalla bazaar bhua Pandariba Jaunpur and mohalla Namaz Gah laldarwaza.

Mohalla Namaz Gah was named by Bibi Rajye, who also built here a monastery and a college. The college was staffed by capable ulema and scholars and professors, and admitted students from all over the country. "Muslim Khwateen ki Taleem "Pg 36 mentions that one school for female education was founded in 845/1441 at Jaunpur by Queen Bibi Rajye.

860 Hijri tamer e qadeem and tameer e mehrab in 1409 Hijri.

Lal Darwaza (Ruby Gate) Mosque owes its name to the vermilion-painted lofty gateway of Bibi Rajye’s royal palace, that stood adjacent to it. It is situated in the extreme north west and known by names mohalla Laldarwza or Begum Ganj.

This Mosque has three gate way of which the eastern one and main gate way is the largest and most important.

As tourist attraction
The city of Jaunpur, situated in the state of Uttar Pradesh, India is known for its mosques that have been the storehouses of history of Medieval India. Much of this recognition is due to Lal Darwaza Masjid in Jaunpur, India. With an influx of a large number of visitors, Jaunpur Lal Darwaza Masjid has become one of the prime tourist attractions in Jaunpur.

References

External links
 Lal Darwaza Mosque

Buildings and structures in Jaunpur, Uttar Pradesh
1447 establishments in Asia
15th-century establishments in India
Sharqi architecture
Mosques in Uttar Pradesh
Tourist attractions in Jaunpur, Uttar Pradesh
Mosques completed in 1447